Assela Wind Power Station is a  wind farm, under construction in the Oromia Region of Ethiopia.

Location

Overview
The power station is owned by the national electricity utility company, Ethiopian Electric Power (EEP). The station comprises 29 energy-generating wind mills, each rated at 3.45 megawatts capacity, for a total of 100 megawatts at maximum output. The generated energy will be integrated into Ethiopia's national electricity grid, through a substation to be built by the state-owned EEP, with a loan of US$10 million, borrowed from the African Development Bank (AfDB). Assela Wind Power Station's annual energy output will be capable of supplying 300,000 Kilo-Watt-Hours of electricity, enough to power 400,000 Ethiopian homes.

Construction
The Engineering, Procurement and Construction contract was awarded to Siemens Gamesa, the Spanish subsidiary of Siemens, the German conglomerate. Construction is expected to start during the first quarter of 2021 and last about 24 months.

Funding
The power station was funded to the tune of €146 million, sourced from the entities listed in the table below:

Ownership
The power station is owned by the Government of Ethiopia, through the national electricity utility company, Ethiopian Electric Power.

Operations
During the construction phase and for the first five years of operations, Siemens Gamesa Denmark, the Danish subsidiary, will maintain 60 percent control of the power station, while Siemens Gamesa Spain, the parent, will maintain 40 percent control. The Siemens Gamesa consortium will be responsible for construction, operations, management, maintenance and repairs, during that period.

See also

List of power stations in Ethiopia

References

External links
 Ethiopia approves Danish loan for 100-MW Assela wind project As of 28 September 2020.

Wind farms in Ethiopia
Oromia Region